Keri Rose Lawson-Te Aho is a New Zealand academic specialising in studying mental health issues and suicide amongst New Zealand's Māori people.

Biography 
In 1995–96, Lawson-Te Aho was a Fulbright scholar and visiting research fellow at the East-West Center in Hawaii. She later travelled in indigenous communities in Alaska and other parts of North America, working on suicide prevention and tribal self-determination projects.

Lawson-Te Aho is a lecturer at the University of Otago's Wellington School of Medicine.

Further reading
Keri Lawson Te-Aho biography from 100MaoriLeaders website

References

Living people
Academic staff of the University of Otago
Year of birth missing (living people)